The 1960 Yale Bulldogs football team represented Yale University in the 1960 NCAA University Division football season.  The Bulldogs were led by ninth-year head coach Jordan Olivar, and played their home games at the Yale Bowl in New Haven, Connecticut.  They finished with a perfect record, 9–0, to win the Ivy League and a share of the Lambert-Meadowlands Trophy, which signified them as co-champions of the East (along with Navy).

Schedule

References

Yale
Yale Bulldogs football seasons
Ivy League football champion seasons
Lambert-Meadowlands Trophy seasons
College football undefeated seasons
Yale Bulldogs football